Jamie Murray and John Peers were the defending champions, but decided not to compete.

Chris Guccione and Rajeev Ram won the title, defeating Colin Fleming and Andre Sá in the final, 6–7(2–7), 6–2, [11–9].

Seeds

Draw

Draw

References
 Main Draw
 Qualifying Draw

Aegon Trophyandnbsp;- Doubles
2014 Men's Doubles